True Stories is a 2009 album recorded by the English guitarist and banjo player Martin Simpson and released on the Topic Records label. The album features a mixture of traditional and original material.

Track listing
 "Look Up, Look Down" - 3:22
 "Sir Patrick Spens" - 3:54
 "Greystones" - 4:19
 "Home Again" - 4:35
 "The Wind And The Rain" - 5:21
 "One Day" - 4:00
 "Will Atkinson" - 3:59
 "Kielder Schottische" - 2:43
 "Lord Thomas And Fair Ellender" - 6:52
 "Done It Again" - 4:02
 "An Englishman Abroad" - 4:22
 "Swooping Molly" - 2:18
 "Stagolee" - 3:29
All titles trad. except 3, 4,7, 10, 11, 12 by Martin Simpson and 6 by Martin Simpson / Martin Taylor

Personnel
 Martin Simpson - banjola, dobro, guitars, 5-string banjo, percussion, vocals, production
 Philip Selway - drums, percussion
 Keith Angel - drums, percussion
 Danny Thompson - bass
 Andy Cutting - accordion
 BJ Cole - pedal steel
 Muireann Nic Amhlaoibh - vocals
 Nigel Eaton - hurdy-gurdy
 Andy Seward - bass, production, mixing
 Kellie While - vocals
 Jon Boden - fiddle
 Denis Blackham - mastering
 Hugo Morris - Photography

References

Martin Simpson albums
2009 albums